Daniel Joseph Levy (born 9 August 1983) is a Canadian actor, writer and producer. Born in Toronto to parents Eugene Levy and Deborah Divine, he began his career as a television host on MTV Canada. He received international prominence and critical acclaim for starring as David Rose in the CBC sitcom Schitt's Creek (2015–2020), which he co-created with his father and co-starred in with him and his sister, Sarah Levy.

For producing, writing, directing, and acting in the final season of Schitt's Creek, Levy became the first person to win a Primetime Emmy Award in all four major disciplines in a single year. His work on the show also earned him four Canadian Screen Awards out of 18 nominations, among other accolades.

Early life 
Levy was born in Toronto, Ontario. He attended high school at North Toronto Collegiate Institute and later pursued film production at York University and Ryerson University.

His father is Jewish and his mother is Protestant. Levy had a bar mitzvah. The family celebrates both Christmas and Hanukkah.

Career

2006–2012: Early work 

Levy began his career as one of the original seven co-hosts on the now defunct MTV Canada flagship series MTV Live. He gained prominence as co-host (with Jessi Cruickshank) of MTV Canada's The After Show and its various incarnations, such as The Hills: The After Show and The City: Live After Show. The shows were occasionally broadcast in the United States as well.

Following The After Show's cancellation and Cruickshank's departure, Levy wrote, produced and starred in his own Christmas Special for MTV, Daniel Levy's Holi-Do's & Don'ts; and co-hosted the MTV Movie Awards Red Carpet, the X-Factor pre-show, and national coverage of the Vancouver 2010 Winter Olympics for CTV. (He also ran a leg of the Olympic torch relay.) He left MTV Canada in 2011 after five years with the network.

As an actor, he has appeared in a four-episode story arc of the Canadian TV series Degrassi: The Next Generation, which premiered as a TV movie called Degrassi Goes Hollywood. In his Degrassi arc, he played a film producer who hires Paige Michalchuk as the lead in a new film directed by actor Jason Mewes. He also appeared in the 2012 thriller Cyberstalker, and in the 2013 comedy-drama film Admission, starring Tina Fey and Paul Rudd.

2015–2020: Schitt's Creek 
In 2015, Levy formed Not a Real Company Productions (with his father Eugene Levy and principals Andrew Barnsley and Fred Levy). Their first project was a television pilot with CBC, which resulted in Schitt's Creek. Levy also starred in the series alongside his father, sister Sarah Levy, Catherine O'Hara, Annie Murphy, and Chris Elliott. It is Not a Real Company Productions' first television series. Levy has spoken publicly about his character's portrayal of pansexuality, saying, "I think in certain parts of America, David's sexual ambiguity was a big question mark. (But) it was issues like that that I find quite exciting."

For his work on Schitt's Creek, Levy has been nominated for numerous awards, including several Canadian Screen Awards for writing and acting, winning the awards for Best Comedy Series, Best Writing in a Comedy Program or Series in 2016, and Best Comedy Series in 2019. In 2019, the series was nominated for the Primetime Emmy Award for Outstanding Comedy Series. In March 2019, Levy announced that the series was renewed for a sixth and final season, and said the decision to end the series after season six on their own creative terms was a "rare privilege".

In July 2017, it was announced that Levy would host The Great Canadian Baking Show with Julia Chan, which had its premiere 1 November on CBC. Controversy arose when John Doyle of The Globe and Mail criticized the show's first episode in a review on 30 October 2017. Included in the review was a critique of Levy's "feyness" while performing as host and a joke hinting at nepotism at CBC. While acknowledging the importance of criticism in media, Levy called the use of the word "feyness" "offensive, irresponsible, and homophobic". The Globes public editor, Sylvia Stead, published a statement on 9 November explaining that "Mr. Doyle was not aware that Mr. Levy was gay and he used the term to mean preciousness". She also acknowledged that, despite the dictionary not defining "fey" as a slur, "we need to understand not just the context of words, but how they evolve and are viewed by communities that may be justly sensitive to a range of meanings." Levy and Chan returned as hosts for the series' second season, which premiered in September 2018. In March 2019, Levy announced via Twitter that he and Chan would not be returning as hosts for the series' third season, citing scheduling conflicts.

In May 2019, he was the keynote speaker at The Infatuation's annual food festival, EEEEEATSCON.

In June 2019, to mark the 50th anniversary of the Stonewall riots that sparked the start of the modern LGBTQ rights movement, Queerty named him one of the Pride50 "trailblazing individuals who actively ensure society remains moving towards equality, acceptance and dignity for all queer people".

In January 2020, he and his father Eugene Levy were guest hosts of The Ellen DeGeneres Show, filling in for Ellen while she took a day off. They did many of the ordinary host activities including interviewing fellow Schitt's Creek cast members Catherine O'Hara and Annie Murphy.

In July 2020, Schitt's Creek was nominated for 15 Primetime Emmy Awards for its final season, with Levy winning Outstanding Comedy Series, Outstanding Supporting Actor in a Comedy Series, Outstanding Writing for a Comedy Series, and Outstanding Directing for a Comedy Series. It became the first comedy series to sweep the four main acting categories in a single year, the first comedy or drama series to win all seven major awards in a single year, and the most-awarded comedy in a single year, beating The Marvelous Mrs. Maisel'''s record. Levy also became the first person to win an award in all four major disciplines in a single year.

 2020–present: Post-Schitt's Creek career 

In August 2020, Levy enrolled in and began to promote the 12-week self-paced Massive Open Online Course (MOOC), "Indigenous Canada", hosted by Dr. Tracy Bear (Montreal Lake First Nation) and Dr. Paul Gareau (Métis and French Canadian) of the University of Alberta. Levy also hosted twelve livestream interviews with the course instructors and weekly guest speakers to discuss topics related to each of the 12 course modules. Levy said in a tweet on 15 November 2020 that the weekly discussions were "nothing short of transformational". Levy also encouraged followers of and participants in the course to donate to the University of Alberta's Faculty of Native Studies, the only faculty of its kind in North America, promising to match donations up to $25,000.

In September 2020, Levy starred alongside Bette Midler, Kaitlyn Dever, Sarah Paulson, and Issa Rae in the HBO television film Coastal Elites. The project was shot remotely and focused on the lives of five individuals navigating the COVID-19 pandemic.

On 6 February 2021, Levy hosted Saturday Night Live with Grammy-nominated musician Phoebe Bridgers as the musical guest.

In September 2019, Levy signed a three-year deal with ABC Signature. In September 2021, it was announced that Levy had signed an overall deal with Netflix to write and produce scripted content across film and TV.

 Personal life 
Levy divides his time between Toronto and Los Angeles, though he has said that London is his "favourite city," after having lived there in 2005.

He previously avoided labelling his sexual orientation publicly, though in a 2015 interview with Flare'' he was called "a member of the LGBT community." In a 2020 interview with Andy Cohen, Levy said that he is "obviously gay" and has been out since he was 18.

Filmography

Film

Television

Music video

Awards and nominations

References

External links

1983 births
Living people
21st-century Canadian male actors
21st-century Canadian male writers
Canadian male television actors
Canadian Screen Award winners
Canadian television hosts
Canadian television producers
Canadian people of Bulgarian-Jewish descent
Canadian people of Polish-Jewish descent
Canadian people of Scottish-Jewish descent
Canadian gay actors
Canadian gay writers
Canadian LGBT broadcasters
LGBT television producers
Male actors from Toronto
Writers from Toronto
Jewish Canadian male actors
Gay Jews
Jewish Canadian writers
Outstanding Performance by a Supporting Actor in a Comedy Series Primetime Emmy Award winners
21st-century Canadian LGBT people